Elham Aminzadeh (born 1964) is an Iranian academic, lawmaker and the former assistant to President Hassan Rouhani in citizenship rights. She was formerly vice president in legal affairs.

Early life and education
Aminzadeh was born in 1964. She holds a PhD in law from the University of Glasgow in 1997. The title of her PhD thesis is "the United Nations and international peace and security: a legal and practical analysis".

Career
Aminzadeh worked as assistant professor of law at the University of Tehran and her speciality is in the fields of international public law, energy law and human rights. She also taught at the School of International Relations, Allameh Tabatabaei University and Imam Sadegh University. She served at the seventh term of the Majlis as a lawmaker from 2004 to 2008. She was the deputy head of the Majlis's national security and foreign policy committee.

She was appointed vice president for legal affairs by Hassan Rouhani, Iranian President, on 11 August 2013 after Hassan Rouhani promised to support the participation of women in the Iranian society.

References

External links

21st-century Iranian women politicians
21st-century Iranian politicians
1964 births
Alliance of Builders of Islamic Iran politicians
Alumni of the University of Glasgow
Deputies of Tehran, Rey, Shemiranat and Eslamshahr
Female vice presidents of Iran
Academic staff of Allameh Tabataba'i University
Living people
Members of the 7th Islamic Consultative Assembly
Members of the Women's fraction of Islamic Consultative Assembly
Presidential aides of Iran
Academic staff of the University of Tehran
Vice Presidents of Iran for Legal Affairs
Women vice presidents
Academic staff of Imam Sadiq University